Rogério Corrêa de Oliveira or simply Rogério Corrêa (born January 3, 1979), is a Brazilian football coach and former professional footballer who is currently the manager of Votuporanguense.

Career
Rogério Corrêa played for Illichivets in 2008, joining Bahia on January 5, 2009. On March 23, 2009 Joinville have signed the central defender on loan from Bahia for a three-month period.

Honours
Goiás State League: 2001, 2006
Brazilian League: 2001
Paraná State Superleague: 2002

References

External links

 sambafoot.com
 CBF
 furacao.com
 atleticopr.com
 zerozero.pt
 placar
 globo.com

1979 births
Living people
Brazilian footballers
Brazilian football managers
Brazilian expatriate footballers
Ukrainian Premier League players
J1 League players
Expatriate footballers in Japan
Expatriate footballers in Ukraine
Brazilian expatriate sportspeople in Ukraine
Goiânia Esporte Clube players
Esporte Clube Santo André players
Vila Nova Futebol Clube players
Shimizu S-Pulse players
Goiás Esporte Clube players
Club Athletico Paranaense players
FC Mariupol players
Esporte Clube Bahia players
Joinville Esporte Clube players
Associação Atlética Anapolina players
Associação Atlética Anapolina managers
Campeonato Brasileiro Série A players

Association football defenders
Sportspeople from Goiânia